Greenfield Township is the name of some places in the U.S. state of Pennsylvania:
Greenfield Township, Blair County, Pennsylvania
Greenfield Township, Erie County, Pennsylvania
Greenfield Township, Lackawanna County, Pennsylvania

See also
Green Township, Pennsylvania (disambiguation)
Greene Township, Pennsylvania (disambiguation)
Greenville Township, Pennsylvania
Greenwich Township, Pennsylvania
Greenwood Township, Pennsylvania (disambiguation)

Pennsylvania township disambiguation pages